Karim al-Din Aqsarayi was a 14th-century Persian  historian and bureaucrat. He is principally known for his Musamarat al-akhbar wa-musayarat al-akhyar, a historical chronicle written in Persian, which mainly focused on Anatolia under the rule of the Mongol Ilkhanate.

References

Sources

Further reading 
 

14th-century Iranian historians
Historians from the Sultanate of Rum
Ilkhanate historians